Debka may refer to:
 Dabke, a traditional folk dance of the Middle East
 Debkafile, an Israeli political and military intelligence website